The Turbomeca Marboré is a small turbojet engine that was produced by Turbomeca from the 1950s into the 1970s. The most popular uses of this engine were in the Fouga CM.170 Magister and the Morane-Saulnier MS.760 Paris. It was also licensed for production in the United States as the Teledyne CAE J69.

The original Marboré, as well as Marboré III, IV, and V were not produced in significant numbers.

Variants

Marboré IPrototypes and test examples
In its most basic form, it is a single-spool, centrifugal compressor turbojet. Variations include military or civilian aircraft, oil tank design, auxiliary equipment, and exhaust pipe configuration. Some variants also included one axial stage compressor for additional performance. The engine dimensions differ depending on the variant, auxiliary components and mounting configurations.
Marboré IIA
Marboré IIB
Marboré IIC
Marboré IIF
Marboré IIG
Marboré III
Marboré IV
Marboré V
This was a 23% increase in thrust with slightly more than a 9% increase in fuel consumption. As a result, the VI series were used to re-engine many II-series powered aircraft, and Marboré II engines became available at discount prices.
Teledyne CAE J69: Licence production and development in the United States.
Marboré VIC
Marboré VIF

Applications

Marboré
Ambrosini Sagittario
Bölkow Bo 46
Fouga CM.170 Magister
Fouga CM.175 Zéphyr
Hispano HA-200
Miles Student
Morane-Saulnier MS.755 Fleuret
Morane-Saulnier MS.760 Paris
Nord Aviation CT20
SNCASO Deltaviex
SNCASO Trident
Stargate YT-33

J69
See Teledyne CAE J69

Specifications (Marboré II)

See also

References

 Gunston, Bill. World Encyclopedia of Aero Engines. Cambridge, England. Patrick Stephens Limited, 1989.

External links

 Iconic's Marbore IIC
 Aircraft fitted with MARBORE II or VI
minijets website Marboré I
Minijets website Marboré II / IV

Marbore
1950s turbojet engines
Centrifugal-flow turbojet engines